The 2000 Bulgarian Cup Final was played at the Hristo Botev Stadium in Plovdiv on 31 May 2000 and was contested between the sides of Neftochimic Burgas and Levski Sofia. The match was won by Levski Sofia.

Match

Details

See also
1999–2000 A Group

Bulgarian Cup finals
Cup Final
PFC Levski Sofia matches